The Rotary Club of Manila is the first and oldest Rotary Club in Asia.  After its establishment, the Rotary Club of Manila sponsored other organizations, including the Rotary Club of Cebu (1932), the Rotary Club of Iloilo (1933), the Community Chest Foundation, the Philippine Band of Mercy (1937), the Philippine Safety Council, and the Boy Scouts of America Philippine Islands Council (1923).

Founding
In 1919, Manila businessman Leon J. Lambert sent communication to the Rotary Club in Chicago about the possibility of organizing Rotary in the Philippines. In response to Lambert's proposal, Rotary sent Roger D. Pinneo of the Seattle Rotary Club to the Philippines to help set up a club in Manila. On 12 January 1919, Pinneo and Lambert held a luncheon meeting with four of Manila's prominent businessmen (Alfa Walter Beam, Fred Neal Berry, Edwin Emil Elser, and James Geary) to form an organizing committee. Another meeting later resulted in the formation of a Manila Rotary Club. The 38 charter members were men heavily involved in the sociopoliticoeconomic life of the country and active in many socio-civic endeavors. They included 35 Americans, 2 Filipinos, and 1 Chinese. Elected as officers were President Leon Lambert, Vice President Alfonso Sy Cip, Secretary Edwin Emil Elser, Treasurer Alfa Walter Beam, and Directors Fred Neal Berry, Gregorio Morente Nieva, and James Geary.

The Rotary Club of Manila subsequently informed Rotary International in Chicago that the Manila Club had been formally organised. In June 1919, the Rotary Club of Manila heard from what became Rotary International, recognizing the Manila club with Charter 478.

Founding officers
 Leon J. Lambert: Sergeant, 13th Minnesota Volunteer Infantry, Spanish–American War (Aug 1898) and Philippine–American War (Feb–Aug 1899). Owner of Lambert Sales Co. and other businesses. Philippine delegate to Democratic National Convention, 1920, 1924, 1928, 1932. Honorary Vice-President, Democratic Party, 1912. Member, Committee on Rules and Order of Business, Democratic Party, 1912. Member, Platform and Resolutions Committee, Democratic Party, 1924.
 Alfonso Sycip / Xue Fenshi (1883–1969): The one Chinese RCM charter member. Chairman, Philippine Chinese General Chamber of Commerce, 1934–41.
 Edwin Emil Elser (21 Feb 1867, Hartford, Connecticut – 17 Jul 1962): Arrived in Manila in 1901 as agent of E.C. McCullough & Co. Became the leader in the Philippine insurance business, and an officer in some 20 companies and the American Chamber of Commerce of the Philippine Islands. Rotary Club of Manila President, 1922–23. Member, Philippine Council of National Defense. Grand Master, Grand Lodge, Free and Accepted Masons of the Philippine Islands, 1921. Philippine alternate delegate to the Republican National Convention, 1920, 1936. Brother of Manila businessman Henry W. Elser. As Rotary Club of Manila President in 1922, E. E. Elser wrote to the BSA regarding the possibility of organizing a Boy Scout Council in Manila. This resulted in the establishment of the Boy Scouts of America Philippine Islands Council.
 Alfa Walter Beam (15 Mar 1878, Bullionville, Lincoln County, Nevada –1 5 Mar 1944, Arlington, Virginia): Arrived in the Philippines in 1902 to take up assignment at Post Office. Later became President of Benguet Consolidated Mining Company.
 Fred Neal Berry (1884–1955): Arrived in the Philippines in 1898; served in the Spanish–American War. Clerk, Records Division, Civil Service of the Philippine Islands, 1904. Became agent of Procter and Gamble.
 Gregorio Nieva y Morente (1880–1952): Editor and publisher, The Philippine Review, 1916–21. One of the two Filipino charter members of the RCM, the other being Gabriel Lao.
 James Geary: Manager, Castle Bros., Wolf & Sons.

Notes

External link 
History of the Rotary Club of Manila

Rotary clubs
Organizations based in Manila
Organizations established in 1919
People of American colonial Philippines